Désiré is a 1937 French comedy film directed by Sacha Guitry and starring Guitry, Jacqueline Delubac, Jacques Baumer and Arletty.

Synopsis
Odette, an actress and the mistress of a government minister, hires a stylish new valet Désiré. Before long this provokes the jealously of her lover, when she begins dreaming aloud about her valet.

Cast
 Sacha Guitry as Désiré Tronchais, valet de chambre
 Jacqueline Delubac as Odette Cléry
 Jacques Baumer as Felix Montignac
 Saturnin Fabre as Adrien Corniche
 Alys Delonce as Henriette Corniche, femme d'Adrien
 Arletty as Madeleine Crapicheau, la femme de chambre
 Pauline Carton as Adèle Vazavoir, la cuisinière
 Geneviève Vix as La comtesse

References

Bibliography 
 Oscherwitz, Dayna & Higgins, MaryEllen. The A to Z of French Cinema. Scarecrow Press, 2009.

External links 
 

1937 films
French comedy films
1937 comedy films
1930s French-language films
Films directed by Sacha Guitry
Tobis Film films
1930s French films